Ameletus browni is a mayfly in the family Ameletidae ("combmouthed minnow mayflies"), in the order Ephemeroptera ("mayflies"). A common name for Ameletus browni is "purple marram".
Ameletus browni is found in North America. It is native to Canada and the Continental US.

References

 
 Mayfly Central, Purdue University

External links
NCBI Taxonomy Browser, Ameletus browni

Notes
 Mayfly Central: The Mayflies of North America (2009) Distribution values: [CAN:NE;USA:NE]

Mayflies